Letícia Santos de Oliveira (born 2 December 1994), commonly known as Letícia Santos, is a Brazilian footballer who plays as a defender for German Frauen-Bundesliga club Eintracht Frankfurt  and the Brazil women's national team.

Club career
In January 2015 Letícia transferred from São José to Avaldsnes IL of the Norwegian Toppserien. After two seasons in Norway she signed for the German club SC Sand. She extended her contract a year later after her performances impressed the team's coach. In June 2019, Letícia was transferred from SC Sand to 1. FFC Frankfurt.

International career
With the Brazil women's national under-20 football team, she attended the FIFA U-20 Women's World Cup in 2014.

She was selected by the senior Brazil women's national football team for the first time in March 2017 for a friendly against Bolivia in Manaus. She started the match and assisted Marta for Brazil's third goal in their 6–0 win. In October 2017, Letícia was recalled to the senior national team for the 2017 Yongchuan International Tournament as a replacement for regular right-back Fabiana who withdrew with a knee sprain.

Notes

References

External links
 

1994 births
Living people
Footballers from São Paulo (state)
Brazilian women's footballers
Women's association football defenders
São José Esporte Clube (women) players
Avaldsnes IL players
SC Sand players
Eintracht Frankfurt (women) players
1. FFC Frankfurt players
Toppserien players
Frauen-Bundesliga players
Brazil women's international footballers
2019 FIFA Women's World Cup players
Footballers at the 2020 Summer Olympics
Olympic footballers of Brazil
Brazilian expatriate women's footballers
Brazilian expatriate sportspeople in Norway
Expatriate women's footballers in Norway
Brazilian expatriate sportspeople in Germany
Expatriate women's footballers in Germany
People from Atibaia